Wolverhampton bus station  is the first part of a major public transport interchange in the city centre of Wolverhampton, in the West Midlands region of England.

It is managed by Transport for West Midlands (TfWM). Local bus services operated by various companies serve the bus station which has 19 departure stands and 1 unloading stand. The bus station is located halfway between Wolverhampton, St George's West Midlands Metro tram terminus and Wolverhampton railway station; both are just a short walk away. It also features glass-enclosed waiting areas and electronic doors, allowing passengers out of designated pedestrian areas, only when buses are on stand. Uniquely, the designs for the station have meant that there is no need for buses and pedestrians paths to cross, due to the 'W' shape of the station.

The bus station's enquiry office is now in the main building, but was in the Queen's Building, a grade II listed building, which was host to Costa Coffee, but which was formerly the carriage entrance to the railway station and is currently empty. It has been announced that the travel shop will close permanently on 1st April 2023.

The original bus station was on the northern side of Railway Drive approximately where the Ring Road passes under the present road bridge.  It was primarily used by Midland Red although a few WMPTE (ex-Midland Red) services also departed from there.

The Interchange Project
The station, which had existed since 1986, was closed after service finished on 3 April 2010. (The 1986 bus station replaced the 1980 bus station on the same site which in turn had replaced the original bus station on the northern side of Railway Drive.)  Building work took place during the ensuing months, in which a new pedestrian bridge linking the railway and bus stations was built, a contraflow system installed along the ring road and the bus station rebuilt. The station re-opened on 24 July 2011, which coincided with the Wolverhampton bus network review and marked the end of Phase One of the project. Phase Two includes improvements to the railway station, a new hotel, and redevelopment of the canalside area, but a date for this has yet to be finalised.

During, December 2014 the next phase of the Interchange project was given the go ahead, the next phase of the project comprises the refurbishment and extension of the Railway Station Car Park, it has seen  the car parks capacity increased to just over 900 parking spaces, the whole interchange project will see all public transport in Wolverhampton connecting in one place, eventually linking the bus station, railway station and the West Midlands Metro with the latter's Piper's Row tram stop to be located adjacent to the bus station.

External links
Information on the redevelopment of the bus station and the plans for the new one.
  Wolverhampton Interchange Phase One

References

Where to board your bus - Network West Midlands.com

Bus stations in the West Midlands (county)
Buildings and structures in Wolverhampton
Transport in Wolverhampton